Peerapol Chawchiangkwang (born 17 October 1986 in Chiang Mai) is a Thai cyclist, who currently rides for UCI Continental team .

Major results

Road

2013
 3rd Road race, National Road Championships
2014
 1st  Road race, National Road Championships
2015
 2nd Road race, National Road Championships
2017
 2nd  Team time trial, Southeast Asian Games
 7th Overall Tour de Singkarak
2018
 2nd Overall Tour de Indonesia
1st Stage 4
 4th Road race, Asian Games
2019
 Southeast Asian Games
1st  Team time trial
1st  Team road race
2021
 National Road Championships
1st  Time trial
2nd Road race
2022
 1st  Team time trial, Southeast Asian Games
 1st  Time trial, National Road Championships
 7th Overall Tour of Azerbaijan (Iran)

MTB
2013
 1st  Cross-country, Southeast Asian Games
2015
 1st  Team relay, Asian Championships
2016
 1st  Team relay, Asian Championships
2020
 3rd  Cross-country, Asian Championships

References

External links

1986 births
Living people
Peerapol Chawchiangkwang
Cyclists at the 2010 Asian Games
Cyclists at the 2014 Asian Games
Cyclists at the 2018 Asian Games
Peerapol Chawchiangkwang
Competitors at the 2019 Southeast Asian Games
Southeast Asian Games medalists in cycling
Peerapol Chawchiangkwang
Competitors at the 2021 Southeast Asian Games
Peerapol Chawchiangkwang
Peerapol Chawchiangkwang